Şeref Özcan (born 8 June 1996) is a German footballer who plays as a midfielder for Turkish club Altınordu.

Career
Özcan made his professional debut for Preußen Münster in the 3. Liga on 19 July 2019, starting in the away match against 1860 Munich before being substituted out in the 68th minute for Luca Schnellbacher, which finished as a 1–1 draw.

References

External links
 Profile at DFB.de
 Profile at kicker.de
 

1996 births
People from Nordenham
Footballers from Lower Saxony
German people of Turkish descent
Living people
German footballers
Association football midfielders
Fortuna Düsseldorf II players
Berliner AK 07 players
SC Preußen Münster players
Menemenspor footballers
Altınordu F.K. players
Oberliga (football) players
Regionalliga players
3. Liga players
TFF First League players
German expatriate footballers
Expatriate footballers in Turkey
German expatriate sportspeople in Turkey